Qiandeng Lake station, known as Qiandenghu Lake station during 2010–2021, formerly Haiwu Lu station during planning, is a metro station on the Guangfo Line (FMetro Line 1).  It is located under the junction of Guilan Road and Haiwu Road, near Qiandeng Lake Park, in Guicheng Subdistrict, Nanhai District, Foshan. It was completed on 3November 2010.

Station layout

Exits

References

Foshan Metro stations
Nanhai District
Railway stations in China opened in 2010
Guangzhou Metro stations